The Florida black wolf (Canis rufus floridanus), also known as the Florida wolf and the black wolf, is an extinct subspecies of red wolf that was endemic to Florida. This subspecies became extinct in 1934 due to crowding out of its habitat and hunting.

Species controversy
This wolf is recognized as a subspecies of Canis lupus in the taxonomic authority Mammal Species of the World (2005). 

Currently, this canid is widely considered to be a subspecies of the red wolf Canis rufus and that a variation in the red wolf's coloring led to the creation of the Florida black wolf. It was believed by one author that instead of being a subspecies of the red wolf, it was actually a type of coyote.

References

Endemic fauna of Florida
Extinct mammals of North America
Wolves in the United States
Subspecies of Canis lupus
Mammals described in 1912